Narayanpur district is one of the 33 districts of Chhattisgarh State in Central India. It is one of the two districts created on May 11, 2007. It was carved out from the erstwhile Bastar district. This district occupies an area of 6640 km2 and it had a population of 110,800 in 2001. Narayanpur town is the administrative headquarters of this district. This district comprises 366 villages.  It is currently a part of the Red Corridor.

As of 2011 it is the least populous district of Chhattisgarh (out of 18).

The present district collector and magistrate of Narayanpur is Mr. Dharmesh Sahu, IAS.

Jagadalpur is the nearest major town to Narayanpur and it is around 120 km away. National High-way is situated at a distance of around 50 km from Narayanpur. Nearest railway stations to Narayanpur, from where inter-state trains run are Jagadalpur and RajaNandagaon and they are located at a distance of 120 km and 180 km respectively.

Being a part of Bastar division with a large presence of Naxalite insurgents, transportation and medical facilities are the two major concerns for people who live here.

Abujhmad Peace Marathon is the largest sports event of Narainpur. State Bank of India has opened its branch in 1977 to provide financial services to the people of Narainpur.

Demographics
According to the 2011 census Narayanpur district has a population of 139,820, roughly equal to the nation of Saint Lucia. This gives it a ranking of 606th in India (out of a total of 640). Its population growth rate over the decade 2001-2011 was 19.49%. Narayanpur has a sex ratio of 998 females for every 1000 males, and a literacy rate of 49.59%. Scheduled Castes and Scheduled Tribes make up 3.56% and 77.36% of the population respectively.

92.38% of the population stated their religion as Hinduism. 6.11% other (tribal faiths) and 0.55% Muslims.

At the time of the 2011 Census of India, 65.25% of the population in the district spoke Gondi, 18.14% Halbi, 9.08% Chhattisgarhi, 4.05% Hindi, and 1.27% Bengali as their first language.

Geography 
Narayanpur District is divided into two administrative blocks:
 Narayanpur, having 45 Graama Panchayats with 176 villages (172 inhabited), is spread over an area of 2760 km2.
Orchha, having 24 Gram Panchayats with 237 villages (209 inhabited), is spread over an area of 3880 km2.
Orchha comprises the Abujhmad region, the unsurveyed zone in central India and home to Primitive Tribal Group Madia Gond and Muriya Gond.

Narayanpur receives an average annual rainfall of 1300 mm.

Politics 
Narayanpur is under Bastar Lok Sabha constituency, whose MP is Deepak Baij from the Indian National Congress. The MLA from Narayanpur assembly constituency is Chandan Kashyap from the Indian National Congress.

Villages
 

Jhulna suman kumar

References

External links
 Official website
State Bank of India has the most branches in Narayanpur District

 
Districts of Chhattisgarh
States and territories established in 2007
2007 establishments in Chhattisgarh